Jens Frølich (28 April 1914 – 27 December 1938) was a Norwegian fencer. He competed in the individual and team foil events at the 1936 Summer Olympics.

References

External links
 

1914 births
1938 deaths
Norwegian male foil fencers
Olympic fencers of Norway
Fencers at the 1936 Summer Olympics
Sportspeople from Oslo
20th-century Norwegian people